Joeano Pinto Chaves (born 12 August 1979), known simply as Joeano, is a Brazilian former professional footballer who played as a striker.

Club career
Born in Fortaleza, Ceará, Joeano moved to Portugal, where he would remain for the majority of his career, at the age of 20, signing with amateurs C.D. Arrifanense from local Fortaleza Esporte Clube. In the 2002–03 season he scored 29 goals with third division club A.D. Sanjoanense, helping his team rank ninth and attracting the attention of UD Salamanca of the Spanish second level.

In the 2004 January transfer window, however, Joeano returned to Portugal and signed for Académica de Coimbra, netting six times in only 13 games to help the side avoid relegation from the Primeira Liga. In summer 2006, after having scored 12 goals for the Students in his second full campaign, he joined Beitar Jerusalem F.C. in Israel.

After failing to meet expectations at the Teddy Kollek Memorial Stadium, Joeano returned to his previous club in January 2007, on loan, with Académica also agreeing to pay half of his salary. On 4 February he played his first league match, coming on as a 32nd-minute substitute and scoring the only goal of the away fixture against Associação Naval 1º de Maio with eight to go.

Joeano played two seasons in Cyprus with Ermis Aradippou FC, netting a career-best in the professionals 22 goals in 2009–10 (a competition joint-best). In the 2011 offseason, after the team's relegation from the First Division, he returned to Portugal and signed for F.C. Arouca in the second tier.

References

External links

1979 births
Living people
Sportspeople from Fortaleza
Brazilian footballers
Association football forwards
Fortaleza Esporte Clube players
Primeira Liga players
Liga Portugal 2 players
Segunda Divisão players
A.D. Sanjoanense players
Associação Académica de Coimbra – O.A.F. players
Vitória F.C. players
F.C. Arouca players
Rio Ave F.C. players
Anadia F.C. players
U.D. Leiria players
FC Pampilhosa players
Segunda División players
UD Salamanca players
Israeli Premier League players
Beitar Jerusalem F.C. players
Cypriot First Division players
Ermis Aradippou FC players
Brazilian expatriate footballers
Expatriate footballers in Portugal
Expatriate footballers in Spain
Expatriate footballers in Israel
Expatriate footballers in Cyprus
Brazilian expatriate sportspeople in Portugal
Brazilian expatriate sportspeople in Spain
Brazilian expatriate sportspeople in Israel
Brazilian expatriate sportspeople in Cyprus